An igloo is a type of shelter built of snow, originally built by the Inuit.

Igloo may also refer to:

Buildings
 Bunker
Igloo, South Dakota, former United States ordnance depot
Ammunition Igloo, Colorado, United States
The Igloo, a nickname for the Pittsburgh Civic Arena
Igloo, a module on the Spacelab
Igloo, a large half-cylindrical building used for industrial purposes, similar to a Nissen hut

Companies and products
Igloo Products Corporation, an American manufacturer of ice chests
Igloo Records, a Belgian record label
Igloo (New Zealand), a pay TV service

Places
Igloo Hill, Antarctic peninsula
Igloo Spur, a spur near the Antarctic continent

Other
Igloo (1932 film), an American documentary film
Igloo (2019 film), a Tamil film
"Igloo", a song from the Where the Wild Things Are: Motion Picture Soundtrack
Igloo or Iggy (1924–1931), the dog which accompanied Richard Evelyn Byrd on his expeditions to the North and South Poles

See also